Gideon v. Wainwright, 372 U.S. 335 (1963), was a landmark U.S. Supreme Court decision in which the Court ruled that the Sixth Amendment of the U.S. Constitution requires U.S. states to provide attorneys to criminal defendants who are unable to afford their own. The case extended the right to counsel, which had been found under the Fifth and Sixth Amendments to impose requirements on the federal government, by imposing those requirements upon the states as well.

Background
Between midnight and 8:00 a.m. on June 3, 1961, a burglary occurred at the Bay Harbor Pool Room in Panama City, Florida. An unknown person broke a door, smashed a cigarette machine and a record player, and stole money from a cash register. Later that day, a witness reported that he had seen Clarence Earl Gideon in the poolroom at around 5:30 that morning, leaving with a wine bottle, Coca-Cola, and change in his pockets. Based on this accusation alone, the police arrested Gideon and charged him with breaking and entering with intent to commit petty larceny.   

Gideon appeared in court alone as he was too poor to afford counsel, whereupon the following conversation took place:

The trial court declined to appoint counsel for Gideon. As a result, he was forced to act as his own counsel and conduct his own defense in court, emphasizing his innocence in the case. At the conclusion of the trial, the jury returned a guilty verdict. The court sentenced Gideon to serve five years in the state prison.

Gideon first filed a petition for a writ of habeas corpus in the Supreme Court of Florida. In his petition, he claimed his Sixth Amendment right had been violated because the judge refused to appoint counsel. The Florida Supreme Court denied Gideon's petition. Later, from his cell at the Florida State Prison in Raiford, making use of the prison library and writing in pencil on prison stationery, Gideon appealed to the United States Supreme Court in a suit against the Secretary of the Florida Department of Corrections, H. G. Cochran. Cochran retired and was replaced by Louie L. Wainwright before the Supreme Court heard the case. Gideon argued in his appeal that he had been denied counsel and therefore that his Sixth Amendment rights, as applied to the states by the Fourteenth Amendment, had been violated.

The Supreme Court assigned Gideon a prominent Washington, D.C., attorney, future Supreme Court justice Abe Fortas of the law firm Arnold, Fortas & Porter. Fortas was assisted by longtime Arnold, Fortas & Porter partner Abe Krash and future famed legal scholar John Hart Ely, then a third-year student at Yale Law School. Bruce Jacob, who later became Dean of the Mercer University School of Law and Dean of Stetson University College of Law, argued the case for Florida.

During oral arguments before the Supreme Court, Fortas repeatedly asserted that the existing framework for a state trial court to appoint counsel was unworkable. Under the existing framework, a magistrate in a preliminary hearing determined whether there were "special circumstances" in the case meriting that the defendant receive counsel. But as Fortas highlighted, that determination occurred too early in the case to be of any use. For example, whether a witness's statement should be barred because it was hearsay is an extremely complicated issue that no layman could readily confront, and such a situation arises only during a trial.

As a second point, Fortas presented during oral argument that it was widely accepted in the legal community that the first thing any reputable lawyer does when accused of a crime is hire an attorney. As an example, Fortas noted that when Clarence Darrow, who was widely known as the greatest criminal attorney in the United States, was charged with jury tampering and suborning perjury, the first thing he did was get an attorney to represent him. Fortas suggested that if a lawyer as prominent as Darrow needed an attorney to represent him in criminal proceedings, then a man without a legal education, or any education for that matter, needed a lawyer too. Fortas's former Yale Law School professor, longtime friend and future Supreme Court colleague Justice William O. Douglas praised his argument as "probably the best single legal argument" in his 36 years on the court.

Court decision

The Supreme Court's decision was announced on March 18, 1963, and delivered by Justice Hugo Black. The decision was announced as being unanimous in favor of Gideon. Two concurring opinions were written by Justices Clark and Harlan. Justice Douglas wrote a separate opinion. The Supreme Court decision specifically cited its previous ruling in Powell v. Alabama (1932). Whether the decision in Powell v. Alabama applied to non-capital cases had sparked heated debate. Betts v. Brady (1942) had earlier held that, unless certain circumstances were present, such as illiteracy or low intelligence of the defendant, or an especially complicated case, there was no need for a court-appointed attorney in state court criminal proceedings. Betts had thus provided the selective application of the Sixth Amendment right to counsel to the states, depending on the circumstances, as the Sixth Amendment had only been held binding in federal cases. Gideon overruled Betts, holding that the assistance of counsel, if desired by a defendant who could not afford to hire counsel, was a fundamental right under the United States Constitution, binding on the states, and essential for a fair trial and due process of law regardless of the circumstances of the case. The Court explained its rationale in these words:

Clark's concurring opinion stated that the Sixth Amendment does not distinguish between capital and non-capital cases, so legal counsel must be provided for an indigent defendant in all cases. Harlan's concurring opinion stated that the mere existence of a serious criminal charge in itself constituted special circumstances requiring the services of counsel at trial.

Gideon v. Wainwright was one of a series of Supreme Court decisions that confirmed the right of defendants in criminal proceedings, upon request, to have counsel appointed both during the trial and on appeal. In the subsequent cases Massiah v. United States, 377 U.S. 201 (1964), and Miranda v. Arizona 384 U.S. 436 (1966), the Supreme Court further extended the rule to apply during police interrogation.

Implications

About 2,000 people were freed in Florida alone as a result of the Gideon decision. The decision did not directly result in Gideon being freed; instead, he received a new trial with the appointment of defense counsel at the government's expense.

Gideon chose W. Fred Turner to be his lawyer in his second trial. The retrial took place on August 5, 1963, five months after the Supreme Court ruling. During the trial, Turner picked apart the testimony of eyewitness Henry Cook. In his opening and closing statements, Turner suggested that Cook likely had been a lookout for a group of young men who broke into the poolroom to steal beer and then grabbed the coins while they were there. Turner also obtained a statement from a cab driver who had taken Gideon from Bay Harbor to a bar in Panama City, stating that Gideon was carrying neither wine, beer, nor Coca-Cola when he picked him up, even though Cook testified that he had watched Gideon walk from the pool hall to a payphone and then wait for a cab. This testimony completely discredited Cook.

The jury acquitted Gideon after one hour of deliberation. After his acquittal, Gideon resumed his previous life and married sometime later. He died of cancer in Fort Lauderdale on January 18, 1972, at age 61. Gideon's family in Missouri accepted his body and laid him to rest in an unmarked grave. A granite headstone was added later. It was inscribed with a quote from a letter Gideon wrote to Abe Fortas, the attorney appointed to represent him in the Supreme Court: "Each era finds an improvement in law for the benefit of mankind."

Impact on courts
The former "incorrect trial" rule, where the government was given a fair amount of latitude in criminal proceedings as long as there were no "shocking departures from fair procedure", was discarded in favor of a firm set of "procedural guarantees" based on the Constitution. The court reversed Betts and adopted rules that did not require a case-by-case analysis, but instead established the requirement of appointed counsel as a matter of right, without a defendant's having to show "special circumstances" that justified the appointment of counsel. In this way, the case helped to refine stare decisis: when a prior appellate court decision should be upheld and what standard should be applied to test a new case against case precedent to achieve acceptable practice and due process of law.

Public defender system
Many changes have been made in the prosecution and legal representation of indigent defendants since the Gideon decision. The decision created and then expanded the need for public defenders, which had previously been rare. For example, immediately following the decision, Florida required public defenders in all of its circuit courts.

The need for more public defenders also led to a need to ensure that they were properly trained in criminal defense, in order to allow defendants to receive as fair a trial as possible. Several states and counties followed suit. Washington, D.C., for instance, has created a training program for their public defenders, who must receive rigorous training before they are allowed to represent defendants, and must continue their training in order to remain current in criminal law, procedure, and practices. In 2010, a public defender's office in the South Bronx, The Bronx Defenders, created the Center for Holistic Defense, which has helped many state public defender offices and developed a model of public defense called holistic defense or holistic advocacy. In it, criminal defense attorneys work on interdisciplinary teams, alongside civil attorneys, social workers, and legal advocates to help clients with not only direct but also collateral aspects of their criminal cases. More recently the American Bar Association and the National Legal Aid and Defender Association have set minimum training requirements, caseload levels, and experience requirements for defenders.

There is often controversy about whether public defenders' caseloads give them enough time to defend their clients adequately. Some criticize public defenders for encouraging their clients to plead guilty. Some defenders say this is intended to lessen their own workload, while others say it is intended to obtain a lighter sentence by negotiating a plea bargain as compared with going to trial and risking a harsher sentence. Tanya Greene, an ACLU lawyer, has said that that is why 90% to 95% of defendants plead guilty: "You've got so many cases, limited resources, and there's no relief. You go to work, you get more cases. You have to triage."

Cause of the civil right to counsel movement 

Gideon v. Wainwright marked a key transition in legal aid in the United States. Before Gideon, civil litigants were able to access counsel only based on the following three stringent criteria: whether the case had implications for a private corporation; whether their not receiving counsel would render the trial unfair or in some way compromised in procedure; and whether the case affected the government's interests. 

After Gideon, and amid growing concern about the paucity of resources for poverty lawyering and the resource burden of case-by-case counsel determinations, state judges and legislators saw the benefit of ensuring the right to counsel for civil litigants just as Gideon provided for criminal defendants. Additionally, an influential 1997 article by a federal district court judge helped revitalize the conversation about the need and justification for a right to counsel in civil cases.

In contrast to the self-representation movement, the historical civil right to counsel movement was founded on the premise that systemic representation by counsel "ensures more accurate outcomes in civil cases". Proponents of the movement also argue that a right to counsel "saves federal and state government money by helping to avoid the negative externalities caused by litigants wrongly losing their civil cases (such as increased use of shelters, emergency medical care, foster care, police, and public benefits), and increases the public's faith and investment in the judicial process".

While the movement has gained substantial traction over time (for instance, 18 jurisdictions enacted a right to counsel for tenants facing eviction between 2017 and 2022), some of its opponents have argued that it places an unreasonable financial burden on states that have an inadequate understanding of the costs and resources needed for civil counsel. Others argue that the right may lead to constitutionally inadequate representation, as has happened in criminal cases. One judge said that, post-Gideon, "many defendants were represented only by 'walking violations of the Sixth Amendment' [...] No constitutional right is celebrated so much in the abstract and observed so little in reality as the right to counsel". Since publicly financed counsel is not supported financially by the client, there is no guarantee that the appointed counsel will be adequately trained and experienced in the legal domain they are representing.

Civil right to counsel: influence on policy and aid provision 
The movement along with the strong correlation between representation and equitable outcomes for low-income litigants in poverty lawyership scholarship has significantly influenced the policies surrounding legal representation. For example, in 2006, the American Bar Association adopted Resolution 112A, urging jurisdictions to provide legal counsel "as a matter of right at public expense to low-income persons in those categories of adversarial proceedings where basic human needs are at stake". Outside of influencing policy, the civil right to counsel movement has fueled approaches to legal aid that aim to alleviate the financial burden civil litigants face. Aid through lawyer substitutes has become more prevalent, involving non-lawyer professionals who can assist clients in legal matters without the supervision of a certified attorney. Similarly, pro bono legal aid, which involves providing legal services without fees in order to promote public good, has gained prominence.

Waiving the right to counsel
Doughty v. Maxwell demonstrates the differences between how states and the federal government address standards for waiver of the right to counsel. In this case, the Supreme Court granted certiorari and reversed the decision of the Ohio court in Doughty, which held that regardless of Gideon, the defendant waived their right to appointed counsel by entering a plea of guilty. The underlying alleged crime and trial in Doughty took place in Ohio, which had its own way of interpreting the right to counsel, as do many states. Pennsylvania and West Virginia also deemed that the right to counsel was waived when a plea of guilty was entered. Depending upon one's viewpoint, rules such as these could be seen as an attempt by a state to establish reasonable rules in criminal cases or as an attempt to save money even at the expense of denying a defendant due process. This varies a great deal from federal law, which generally has stricter guidelines for waiving the right to counsel. An analogous area of criminal law is the circumstances under which a criminal defendant can waive the right to trial. Under federal law, the defendant can only waive their right to trial if it is clear that the defendant understands the "charges, the consequences of the various pleas, and the availability of counsel". State laws on the subject are often less strict, making it easier for prosecutors to obtain a defendant's waiver of the right to trial.

Criticism
In Garza v. Idaho, Justice Clarence Thomas, joined by Justice Neil Gorsuch, filed a dissenting opinion suggesting Gideon was wrongly decided and should be overruled. Justice Samuel Alito joined part of the dissent, but did not join the call to overturn Gideon.

See also
 Gideon's Army, a 2013 documentary film about public defenders in the South
 Gideon's Trumpet, a 1964 book and 1980 TV movie based on this case
 List of United States Supreme Court cases, volume 372
 Miranda warning
 Public defender

References

Further reading

   The article describes how 23 state attorneys-general, led by Walter F. Mondale of Minnesota and Edward J. McCormack, Jr. of Massachusetts, when asked by Florida to participate as amici curiae, surprised the Florida Attorney General by submitting a "friend of the court" brief to the Supreme Court on the side of the accused, and advocating for the right to counsel of criminal defendants to defense counsel at the expense of the state.

External links
 
 
 
 Gideon v. Wainwright from C-SPAN's Landmark Cases: Historic Supreme Court Decisions

United States Supreme Court decisions that overrule a prior Supreme Court decision
1963 in United States case law
20th-century American trials
United States Sixth Amendment appointment of counsel case law
Incorporation case law
American Civil Liberties Union litigation
United States Supreme Court cases of the Warren Court
Legal history of Florida
United States Supreme Court cases